This is a list of the official minimum wage rates of the 193 United Nations member states and former members of the United Nations, also including the following territories and states with limited recognition (Northern Cyprus, Kosovo, etc.) and other independent countries. Some countries may have a very complicated minimum wage system; for example, India has more than 1202 minimum wage rates for different types of industries and skill levels. Meanwhile, other countries may have a national rate which often is superseded by state, provincial, cantonal, county and city minimum wage rates. For example, 33 states in the United States have higher minimum wages than the federal rate (plus military rates on federal bases) – on top of this an additional 42 city-level subdivisions having different minimum wage rates and 53 countries. In effect, the United States has over 100 different minimum wages across the nation. This is common in federal nations as Canada, and minimum wage in China also has numerous different rates. In the table below, only the lowest minimum wage is cited, or the highest-level subdivision where it applies.

Methodology 
The minimum wages listed refer to a gross amount, that is before deduction of taxes and social security contributions, which vary from one country to another. Also excluded from calculations are regulated paid days off, including public holidays, sick pay, annual leave and social insurance contributions paid by the employer.

For comparison, an annual wage column is provided in international dollars, a hypothetical unit of currency calculated based on the purchasing power parity (PPP) of household final consumption expenditure. For calculating the annual wage, the lowest general minimum wage was used.

List

OECD

See also 
 List of countries by average annual labor hours
 List of countries by average wage 
 List of countries by median wage
 List of countries by labour productivity
 List of countries by wealth per adult
 List of minimum wage laws
 List of European countries by minimum wage
 List of US states by minimum wage
 List of minimum wages in Canada
 List of minimum wages in China (PRC)
 The Minimum Wages Act, 1948

Notes

References

Minimum wages
Minimum wages